Tricia Black is a Canadian actress, writer and comedian. She is most noted for her role in the 2020 web series Band Ladies, for which she won the Canadian Screen Award for Best Supporting Performance in a Web Program or Series at the 9th Canadian Screen Awards in 2021.

Early life 
Originally from Saint John, New Brunswick, she is an alumna of The Second City's Toronto company, for which she was one of the writers and performers of the Canadian Comedy Award-winning LGBTQ-themed comedy show Extravaganza Eleganza in 2019.

Career 
Black has also been associated with Toronto sketch comedy troupe The Sketchersons, and has had supporting or guest appearances in the television series New Eden, Kim's Convenience, What We Do in the Shadows, Baroness von Sketch Show and Pretty Hard Cases. They can also be seen in feature films like The Broken Hearts Gallery, The Man from Toronto, and as Norris in the upcoming film Dear David.

Filmography

Film

Television

References

External links

1986 births
Living people
21st-century Canadian actresses
21st-century Canadian comedians
Canadian sketch comedians
Canadian comedy writers
Canadian women comedians
Canadian television actresses
Actresses from New Brunswick
Comedians from New Brunswick
Canadian LGBT actors
Lesbian comedians
Canadian Screen Award winners
Canadian LGBT comedians
21st-century Canadian LGBT people